Donald Roy Sidle (June 21, 1946–May 25, 1987) was an American professional basketball player.

A 6'8" forward/center, Sidle played at the University of Oklahoma from 1965 to 1968. He was an All-American in 1967 and 1968, after seasons in which he averaged 23.7 points and 19.8 points per game, respectively.

Sidle was selected by the San Francisco Warriors with the 29th pick of the 1968 NBA Draft, but he spent his professional career in the American Basketball Association as a member of the Miami Floridians, Denver Rockets, Indiana Pacers, and Memphis Pros. Over four seasons (1968-1972) he averaged 13.5 points and 8.0 rebounds per game. He ranked eighth in the ABA in rebounds per game (12.9) and seventh in total rebounds (1,082) during the 1969-70 ABA season.

References

1946 births
1987 deaths
American men's basketball players
Basketball players from Dallas
Centers (basketball)
Denver Rockets players
Indiana Pacers players
Memphis Pros players
Miami Floridians players
Oklahoma Sooners men's basketball players
Power forwards (basketball)
San Francisco Warriors draft picks